Duralex is a French tempered glass tableware and kitchenware manufacturer located in La Chapelle-Saint-Mesmin in Loiret. Using a technique developed in the 1930s by Saint-Gobain, moulded glass is heated to 600 degrees Celsius, then cooled very quickly, giving it an impact resistance twice superior to normal glass.

The Picardie tumbler and the Gigogne glass are two of the company's best-known products. The "Gigogne" glass is in the permanent collection of the Paris Musée des Arts Décoratifs, Paris.

The magazine This Old House called Duralex's OvenChef glass baking dishes one of the best new home products of 2014, citing the dishes' ability to withstand wide temperature swings without shattering.

The brand name is taken from the Latin motto Dura Lex Sed Lex ("The law is tough, but it is the law").

Acquisition 
In January 2021, Duralex was acquired by International Cookware group, the producer of the rival Pyrex brand, for 3.5 million euros ($4.2m).

References

External links 
 
 
 US website

Tableware
Kitchenware brands
Glass trademarks and brands
Glassmaking companies of France
Privately held companies of France
Manufacturing companies established in 1945
1945 establishments in France
French brands